The Quadrilateral Traffic in Transit Agreement (QTTA) is a transit trade deal between China, Pakistan, Kyrgyzstan and Kazakhstan for facilitating transit traffic and trade. In February 2017, Tajikistan expressed interest in joining the deal. A similar desire to join the agreement was expressed by Uzbekistan in May 2020.  The initial work on this road project was initiated in 1995. 

The road project is related to the China Pakistan Economic Corridor, which aims to provide China and Central Asia access to Pakistani ports. After the development of Gawadar Port in Balochistan province of Pakistan, development of this route became more lucrative particularly for Kyrgyzstan and Kazakhstan. For Pakistan its importance has recently increased following frequent border closures with Afghanistan over political hostilities and security issues.

Strategic implications
The strategical importance of this project was reduced when Afghanistan offered Pakistan access to Central Asia via the Afghanistan–Pakistan Transit Trade Agreement. However, in recent years, Afghanistan insisted that India be included in their bilateral transit trade as a condition for allowing Pakistan access to Central Asia, even threatening to cut off the agreement if it was not reciprocated. Pakistan's tensions with India made such an arrangement difficult. The QTTA provides Pakistan an alternative gateway to Central Asia by completely circumventing Afghanistan. It would use the Karakoram Highway which connects Gilgit-Baltistan to China's Xinjiang region, which links to Central Asia.

See also
 China–Pakistan Economic Corridor
 Khyber Pass Economic Corridor
 Afghanistan–Pakistan Transit Trade Agreement

References

China–Pakistan Economic Corridor
China–Pakistan relations
Kazakhstan–Pakistan relations
Kyrgyzstan–Pakistan relations
Pakistan–Tajikistan relations
China–Kazakhstan relations
China–Kyrgyzstan relations
Kazakhstan–Kyrgyzstan relations
China–Tajikistan relations
Kyrgyzstan–Tajikistan relations